Roter Graben is a small river of Bavaria, Germany. It is a right tributary of the Swabian Rezat northeast of Pleinfeld.

See also
List of rivers of Bavaria

Rivers of Bavaria
Weißenburg-Gunzenhausen
Rivers of Germany